Mango is a tropical tree and fruit.

Mango may also refer to:

Plants and birds
 Bell pepper, a variety of pepper known in parts of the United States as a mango
 Mango (cannabis), a cultivar of Cannabis sativa
 Mango melon, a variety of melon
 Mango (hummingbird), a family of hummingbird

Places
 Mango Creek, a village in Belize
 Mango, Jamshedpur, a suburb of Jamshedpur, India
 Mango, Piedmont, commune in Italy
 Mango, Togo, a city in Togo
 Mango (Tonga), an island in Tonga
 Mango, Florida, an unincorporated community in the U.S.

Languages
 Mango language (Chad)
 Mango language (China)

People
 Andrew Mango (1926–2014), British author on contemporary Turkey
 Cyril Mango (1928–2021), British Byzantinist
 Mango (singer) (1954–2014), Italian singer
 Mang0 (born 1991), American electronic sports player
 Marlia Mango, Byzantine archaeologist and historian
 Susan Mango, American biologist

Technology, brands and companies
 Mango (software), a viewer for medical volumetric images
 Mango, the code name of a software update for Windows Phone; see Windows Phone version history
 Mango, a satellite that is part of the Prisma (satellite project)
 Mango (airline), a South African airline
 Mango (smart card), an English public transport smart card
 Mango, a European brand of velomobile
 Mango (retailer), a Spanish clothing company
 Mango Languages, an online language-learning company

Film and TV
 "The Mango" (Seinfeld), an episode of the American TV series Seinfeld
 "The Mango", an episode of Yoko! Jakamoko! Toto!
 Mangoes (TV series), Canadian drama serial about South Asian Youth
 Tears of Steel (code named "Project Mango"), a 2012 open content short film by the Blender Foundation
 Mango (Saturday Night Live), character on the American TV series Saturday Night Live

Music
 Mango (group), Lithuanian pop group
 Mango (singer) (1954–2014), Italian singer
 Mango Records, American record label
 Grupo Mango, Venezuelan salsa group
 Radio Mango 91.9, a radio station in India
 "Mangos" (song), a 1956 song written by Dee Libbey and Sid Wayne
 Mango, a 2020 song by Dev

Other uses
 Mango (color), a yellow-orange color
 Mango (horse), a racehorse
 Mango (poem), a 1936 poem by Vyloppilli Sreedhara Menon
 Letin Mengo, also known as Letin Mango, an electric car

See also
 Manga (disambiguation)
 Mangu (disambiguation)